The Soundscape R.Ed (1997–2001) was the second generation Digital audio workstation manufactured by Soundscape Digital Technology Ltd..
It was renamed the Soundscape 32 after Mackie acquired the product and continued to be available until around 2007.

The system consisted of an external 2U rack unit which housed the audio processing hardware, based on Motorola 563xx family DSPs, 24 inputs and 24 outputs via TDIF digital ports and four IDE hard disk drives (two internal and two with removable trays). Synchronization for the basic unit was via MIDI in/out/thru via MIDI Timecode and an optional Timecode Sync board provided video sync, and LTC in/out. An I/O board provided additional balanced analogue and AES3 connections (2 in, 4 out). Each unit could record and play 32 tracks of 24bit 48 kHz audio or 16 tracks of 24/96. 

The unit connected to an ISA card fitted into a PC expansion slot, each of which could host 2 x R.Ed units. Multiple host cards could be used. 
A PCI version of the Host card was available in 2001.

Windows software (for Windows 3.1, 95/98/ME, 2000, XP) controlled the unit and provided 256 virtual tracks, mixing and editing. This software also supported the legacy Soundscape SSHDR1, although with some limitations. 

Up to 16 units could be used simultaneously, with full sample accurate synchronization, controlled by one Soundscape editing application.

Optional software packages for Auto-Conforming (for film and TV post-production use) and CD Mastering were available as well as a selection of plug-in effects developed by well known companies such as TC Electronic and Dolby Laboratories.

Soundscape 32
The Soundscape 32 was the rebadged version of the Soundscape R.Ed, which was originally manufactured by Soundscape Digital Technology Ltd.
After Mackie acquired the product in 2001, the product remained unchanged, but with little activity until 2002, when the Soundscape 32 was launched. Mackie had revamped the styling of the main rack unit, and the units was certainly more attractive, but internally it was unchanged from the original Soundscape R.Ed.

References

Digital audio workstation software